Syzonenko or Sizonenko is a gender-neutral Ukrainian surname. Notable people with the surname include:

 Alexander Sizonenko (1959–2012), Soviet-Ukrainian basketball player
 Denys Syzonenko (born 1984), Ukrainian swimmer

Ukrainian-language surnames